Osiek Łużycki  is a village in the administrative district of Gmina Zgorzelec, within Zgorzelec County, Lower Silesian Voivodeship, in south-western Poland, close to the German border.

The village has a population of 302.

Notable residents
 Johann Adam Hiller (1728 – 1804), German composer and conductor

References

Villages in Zgorzelec County